"Been Waiting" is a song by Australian R&B singer Jessica Mauboy. Written with Australian singer Israel Cruz and Craig Hardy, the song was released on 6 March 2009 as the third single from Mauboy's debut album, also titled Been Waiting. The song peaked at number 12 on the ARIA Singles Chart and was certified gold by the Australian Recording Industry Association (ARIA).

Chart performance 
"Been Waiting" debuted on the ARIA Singles Chart at number 29 and peaked at number 12 in its fourth week on the chart. It spent a total of 14 weeks in the ARIA top fifty including eight weeks in the top twenty. "Been Waiting" was certified gold by the Australian Recording Industry Association (ARIA) for selling 35,000 copies.

Music video
The music video was directed by Keri McFarlane, who had previously directed the video for "Burn". It was shot at the Cronulla sand dunes in Sydney on 23 February 2009. The video is set at night time and starts off with Mauboy walking through sand dunes, before hitting the nightclub to sing, while people in the background are dancing. It premiered on YouTube on 12 March 2009.

Live performances 
Mauboy performed "Been Waiting" on Rove on 22 February 2009. She also performed the song at the 2009 MTV Australia Awards on 27 March 2009. Mauboy performed the bridge from "Running Back" at the beginning of the performance, before switching to "Been Waiting". It became her first worldwide performance, of which aired on 62 channels in 162 countries via MTV. Mauboy opened the 51st TV Week Logie Awards with a performance of the song on 3 May 2009.

Track listings

Digital EP
 "Been Waiting" – 3:48
 "Now I Know" – 4:15
 "Been Waiting" (Champion Lovers Remix) – 6:29
 "Burn" (Acoustic) – 3:06
 "Been Waiting" (Carl Remix) – 2:55

CD single
 "Been Waiting" – 3:48
 "Now I Know" – 4:15
 "Been Waiting" (Champion Lovers Remix) – 6:29
 "Burn" (Acoustic) – 3:06

Charts

Weekly charts

Year-end charts

Certification

Release history

References

2009 songs
2009 singles
Jessica Mauboy songs
Songs written by Israel Cruz
Songs written by Jessica Mauboy
Sony Music Australia singles